János Hajdú (19 September 1904 – 12 July 1981) was a Hungarian fencer. He competed in the individual and team épée events at the 1928 Summer Olympics.

References

External links
 

1904 births
1981 deaths
Hungarian male épée fencers
Olympic fencers of Hungary
Fencers at the 1928 Summer Olympics
Martial artists from Budapest